The Fiesta de las Cruces ("Festival of the Crosses") or Cruz de Mayo ("May Cross") is a holiday celebrated on 3 May in many parts of Spain and Hispanic America.

Origins
Religiously, the festival is rooted in the legendary search by Byzantine Empress Saint Helena for the cross on which Jesus died, but the popular traditions connected to the festival certainly trace back to pagan traditions brought to Spain by the Roman Empire (see May Day).

The legend is that Emperor Constantine I, in the sixth year of his reign, confronted the barbarians on the banks of the Danube, in a battle where victory was believed to be impossible because of the great size of the enemy army. One night, Constantine had a vision of a cross in the sky, and by it the words "In hoc signo vincis" (With this sign, you shall be victorious). The emperor had a cross made and put it at the front of his army, which won an easy victory over the enemy multitude. On returning to the city and learning the significance of the cross, Constantine was baptized as a Christian and gave orders to construct Christian churches. He sent his mother, Saint Helena, to Jerusalem in search of the True Cross, the cross on which Jesus died. Once there, Helena summoned the wisest priests to aid in her attempt to find the cross. On Calvary Hill, traditionally considered the site of Jesus's crucifixion, she found three bloody logs hidden. In order to discover which was the True Cross, she placed the logs one by one over sick people, and even dead people, who were cured or resuscitated at the touch of the True Cross. The veneration of the True Cross, and the use of pieces of the True Cross as relics, begins at this time. Santa Helena died praying for all believers in Christ to celebrate the commemoration of the day the Cross was found.

Places where the holiday is celebrated 
The "Fiesta de las Cruces" is celebrated in numerous places in Spain and Hispanoamerica.

Spain 

Various groups of people - usually linked to the Hermandades, the religious Brotherhoods who organise the Easter Week processions, get together and decorate a tall cross with flowers.

They choose a pretty square  or street, and also decorate the area around the cross with typical and traditional items.  A guitar.  An embroidered shawl.  Old earthenware pots.  Even an old-fashioned sewing machine!  For the cross of the Hermandad de Nuestra Señora del Carmen, Queen of the Sea, they use fishing nets and tackle.  For San Isidro the Ploughman Saint, they have crops and traditional foodstuff.

They set out these beautiful items, redolent of the past and of the traditions of the town, making an artistic display that everyone comes to admire.

Although it is normally one of the Brotherhoods decorating the crosses, it can also be a group of friends and neighbours, a youth group, a Charity, who get together to produce these lovely events.

 Aguilar de la Frontera (Province of Córdoba). There is a procession of Nuestra Señora de los Remedios from the Iglesia de la Veracruz ("Church of the True Cross") in the Remedios neighborhood
 Aguiama (La Rioja)
 Águilas (Region of Murcia) in the pedanía (sub-municipal district) of Calabardina
 Alboraya (Province of Valencia). Organized by the Junta Local de Hermandades de Semana Santa de Alboraya (Local Alboraya Grouping of Brotherhoods of the Holy Week)
 Alcalá la Real (Province of Jaén)
 Alhama de Murcia (Murcia)
 Alhaurín el Grande (Province of Málaga)
 Aljucer, a pedanía of the city of Murcia
 Alicante, in the Santa Cruz neighborhood
 Almería, throughout the historic center of the city
 Almonaster la Real (province of Huelva)
 Almuñécar (Province of Granada)
 Armilla (Province of Granada). The city government organizes a competition of decorated crosses on 3 May
 Andosilla (Province of Navarre).
 Aranda de Duero (Province of Burgos). A cross is brought down from the church-museum of San Juan to the Plaza Mayor (main square), with hundreds of people dancing behind
 Baza (Granada)
 Berrocal (Huelva)
 Bonares (Huelva)
 Breña Alta (Province of Santa Cruz de Tenerife)
 Breña Baja (Santa Cruz de Tenerife)
 Burriana (Province of Castellón)
 Cabeza la Vaca (Province of Badajoz). At different places around Cabeza la Vaca, crosses are adorned in a variety of motifs. On the night of 2 May, crosses are paraded through town, each accompanied by a musical group. On 3 May a procession goes through the streets of the city, with one primary cross representing the True Cross, but also many other crosses adorned by children with flowers
 Cádiz. Crosses with flowers are taken in procession throughout the city. Also, folk festivals (verbenas) are held in honor of the cross, and many courtyards are decorated in floral motifs
 Cadrete (Province of Zaragoza)
 Caminreal (Province of Teruel)
 Cieza (Murcia)
 Province of Ciudad Real. The festival is celebrated throughout the province. In particular, the celebrations at Campo de Calatrava, Piedrabuena and Villanueva de los Infantes in the comarca Campo de Montiel have been declared to be of Regional Touristic Interest
 Coín (Málaga)
 Córdoba. The Fiesta de las Cruces is combined with a festival can competition for decorated courtyards in the Real Feria de Mayo, with 25 crosses and 50 patios (courtyards)
 Corte de Peleas (Province of Badajoz)
 Dosbarrios (Province of Toledo)
 Écija (Province of Seville). Organized by the Hermandad del Resucitado, with traditional children carrying the crosses. Celebrated on a Sunday (3 May or the first Sunday thereafter).
 El Madroño (Seville)
 El Viso del Alcor (Seville)
 Estepona (Malaga) Held on the first weekend of the month of May. There are about 10 different crosses, in different pretty squares of the town. The Ayuntamiento (Town Council) awards prizes for the best-decorated square and cross.  The idea is to go and visit them all and see if you agree with the judges!  As well as the decoration, there is music, dancing (can you do flamenco?), barbecues and general merriment all weekend long around each cross.
 Feria (Badajoz). Crosses are elaborately decorated in flowers, and altars are set up in rooms throughout the city. In 2008 there were more than 70 crosses. Declared as of National Touristic Interest
 Granada. One of the most beautiful of the festivals, and one of the cities most prominent for its celebrations of the holiday. Prizes are awarded in several categories: courtyards, streets and plazas, windows, and schools. The crosses are adorned with red and white carnations and are often surrounded by artisanal handicrafts and paired with a drinks stand.
 Granja de Rocamora (Alicante)
 Guadalcázar (Córdoba), in the Plaza de España
 Hellín (Province of Albacete)
 Huelva, especially for the Cruz de Mayo of San Pedro
 Jaén
 L'Alfàs del Pi (Province of Alicante)
 La Palma del Condado (Huelva)
 Lebrija (Seville)
 Linares (Jaén)
 Lucena del Puerto (Huelva)
 Málaga
 Martos (Jaén)
 Mengíbar (Jaén)
 Molinillo (Province of Salamanca)
 Montalbán de Córdoba (Córdoba)
 Montilla (Córdoba), in the Barrio de La Cruz.
 Motril (Granada). One of the most prominent of the festivals, rivaling that of Córdoba in fervor and enthusiasm. The festivities are considered of National Touristic Interest and it is considered the city's Feria Chica, that is, its second most important festival
 Murcia (Región de Murcia)
 Mutxamel (Alicante)
 Otura (Granada)
 Piedrabuena (Ciudad Real)
 Pinos del Valle  (Granada). Celebrated 1, 2, and 3 May, and dedicated to Santo Cristo del Zapato
 Puente Genil (Córdoba)
 Paterna (Valencia), where it is celebrated 1 May
 El Puerto de Santa María (Cádiz)
 Torrelaguna (Madrid)
 Rociana del Condado (Huelva), with crosses on Calle La Fuente, Calle Las Huertas, Calle Orozco, Calle Nueva, Calle Cabreros, Calle Sevilla, Calle Candao, Calle Almonte, and Calle Arriba.
 Sagunto (Valencia), where it is celebrated 1 May
 Sama de Grado (Asturias). The origin of this celebration is uncertain, but it may go back as much as 500 years. One of its peculiarities is that instead of a procession centered on a cross, there is a procession of the Virgin of Sorrows dressed in sky blue to celebrate Christ's victory over death. The statue of the Virgin is displayed, successively in three aspects: as the mother of Jesus, as the Dolorosa accompanying Jesus to Calvary, and because May is her month
 Santa Cruz de La Palma (Santa Cruz de Tenerife). The festival here also celebrates the foundation of the city, 3 May 1493
 Santa Cruz de Tenerife. The festival here also celebrates the foundation of the city, 3 May 1494
 Los Realejos (Santa Cruz de Tenerife), in the Barrio de la Cruz Santa
 Seville
 Úbeda (Jaén)
 Valencia
 Valencia de Alcántara (Province of Cáceres)
 Villa de Mazo (Santa Cruz de Tenerife)
 Villabrágima (Province of Valladolid)
 Villalgordo del Marquesado (Province of Cuenca)
 Xàbia (Alicante)

Colombia 
The Departments of Antioquia, Caldas, Quindío, and Risaralda, and the municipality of Funza, diocese of Facatativá, have a large population of Basque descent, who carry on the tradition of the Día de la Santa Cruz ("Day of the Holy Cross") or Día de los Mil Jesuses ("Day of the Thousand Jesuses") on 3 May. People speak the name of Jesus one thousand times, and believe this will protect them through the coming year.

Guatemala 
Most of Guatemala celebrates the Fiesta de las Cruces largely in a symbolic and respectful manner, with colorful processions.

The construction equipment and materials retailer FFACSA, one of Guatemala's leading businesses, sponsors a large and less traditional celebration in Chimaltenango Department. That celebration begins at 6 p.m. on 2 May with a celebration of the eucharist in honor of the Holy Cross. On 3 May people begin to gather at 3 a.m. and parade through the streets of various municipalities of the department, after which there are various sporting activities (including mountain biking and a marathon). At noon, roughly 3,000 construction workers gather for lunch at FFACSA's various branch offices (in Quetzaltenango, Sacatepéquez, Totonicapán) and at their central site in Chimaltenango. After lunch there are raffles, with prizes such as motorcycles, bicycles, televisions, DVD players, and household appliances. At 4 p.m. there is an open-air concert at the park in the center of Chimaltenango, again with raffles and prizes, and from 7 p.m. there are fireworks competitions.

Mexico 
In Mexico, the celebration of the Holy Cross began at the dawn of the 16th century, when captain Juan de Grijalva gave the name Isla de la Santa Cruz to the island now known as Cozumel, Quintana Roo. The holiday is celebrated in Mexico mainly by guilds and unions involved in construction. A cross adorned with flowers and paper is placed in a high position on a building in the process of construction. The workers then celebrate with local cuisine and alcoholic beverages such as tequila, mezcal, and local beer.

Peru 
 Junín (Junín Province, Junín Region)
 Cerro de Pasco (Pasco Province, Pasco Region)
 Huancayo (Huancayo Province, Junín Region)
 Amazonas Region
 Chupaca Province (Junín Region)
 Ayacucho (Huamanga Province, Ayacucho Region)
 Puno (Puno Province, Puno Region)
 Huancavelica (Huancavelica Region)
 Ica Region
 Roman Catholic Diocese of Tacna y Moquegua, comprising the lay administrative regions Tacna Region and Moquegua region

Venezuela 
 Choroní, Aragua State has a celebration of great importance and tradition. The entire village and many visitors have a large festival on the Caribbean shore and dance to drums until dawn in honor of the Cruz de Mayo.
 Guatire, Miranda State has had a cross as its patron since its foundation in the 17th century. The cross is known as Santa Cruz de Pacairigua, after the Pacairigua River, which runs through the city. The sculptured cross resides in the parish church of Guatire, and its festival is 3 May
 In the east of Venezuela and in the Barlovento of Miranda vigils are held for the Cruz de Mayo in which the cross is adorned and praised with fulías and décimas.

El Salvador 

In El Salvador, the Day of the Cross ("Día de la Cruz" in Spanish), as it is known, is celebrated on May 3. This celebration is not considered an official government or church holiday; it only marks the beginning of the "wet" or rainy season in winter. It is a tradition that dates back to prehispanic times during which the indigenous people of the region (Pipiles) offered food to give thanks to the gods and Mother Earth for what they provided. The cross was added when the tradition fused with Catholicism during the colonial period. The cross is made from wood, and decorated with flowers and long chains of colorful tissue paper. Fruits, grains, vegetables, drinks, candies and sometimes money are placed at the foot of the cross as offerings.  Visitors to the household are invited to take offerings with them after they kneel in front of the cross and recite a thanksgiving prayer.

Trinidad 
In Lopinot, Trinidad, parang is performed at the Cruz de Mayo (May Cross) festival, a ritual whose performance strongly mirrors the contemporary Santa Rosa Festival and was likely the source of its patterning. The Cruz de Mayo celebrates the month of Mary, and is also when the maypole is performed, which has even more significance for the Caribs as it was amalgamated into their traditions of weaving the sebucán, their cassava strainer (the dance around the maypole, weaving the ribbons together, is seen as mimicking the weaving of the sebucán).

References

External links 
  Fiestas de la Santa Cruz de Feria (Badajoz), declared by the Spanish government as an event of National Touristic Interest
  Cruces de mayo en Lebrija, declared by the Spanish government as an event of National Touristic Interest
  Fiesta de las cruces en Torrelaguna (Community of Madrid)
  Cruces de mayo en Piedrabuena
  Cruces de Mayo de Córdoba

Catholic holy days
May observances